Heaviside is a large lunar impact crater that is located on the far side of the Moon. It is attached to the eastern rim of the equally large walled plain Keeler, although Keeler is somewhat less eroded. To the northwest lies the crater Stratton, and to the southeast is the prominent Aitken.

The outer wall of Heaviside has been worn and eroded by subsequent impacts, particularly to the north and south. Only the eastern rim remains relatively intact, while the western rim has been slightly distorted by the adjacent Keeler impact.

The relatively flat interior floor is marked by many small craterlets and rugged terrain to the southeast and west. The most notable of these are the satellite craters Heaviside N in the south, Heaviside Z in the north, and the bowl-shaped Heaviside E near the eastern rim.

Satellite craters
By convention these features are identified on lunar maps by placing the letter on the side of the crater midpoint that is closest to Heaviside.

References

 
 
 
 
 
 
 
 
 
 
 
 

Impact craters on the Moon